Pentrefelin railway station was a station on the Tanat Valley Light Railway, located two miles south-east of Llanrhaeadr-ym-Mochnant, Powys, Wales serving the hamlet of Pentrefelin. The station opened in 1904 and formally closed in 1951. The platform was located to the east of a level crossing on a minor road to Glantanat Isaf. The platform had a corrugated iron shelter, lamps and a nameboard. There was a goods loop on the north side of the line. The platform is still extant on farmland.

References

Further reading

Disused railway stations in Powys
Railway stations in Great Britain opened in 1904
Railway stations in Great Britain closed in 1951
Former Cambrian Railway stations